Somfai Kara David (born 21 April 1969, Budapest, Hungary) is a Hungarian academic of Linguistics and Ethnography currently working in the Hungarian Academy of Sciences. He holds a Doctor of Philosophy degree, and his academic discipline focuses on the cultures and languages of the Central Asian people such as Turkic and Mongolic people. Apart from Central Asian Turkic (Kyrgyz, Kazakh etc.) and Mongolian languages, he has a knowledge of English and Russian languages. He also researched on and published several works regarding the folklore, tradition, mythology, and religion of those people.

References

External links 
 Name Authority File of Library of Congress
 Goodreads
 Kazak, Languages of the World on Scribd
 DUNA appearance on Hungarian TV
 https://www.azattyk.org/a/david-kara-somfai_and_istvan-mandoki-kongur_18-5-2017_kyrgyz/28497049.html?nocache=1

Members of the Hungarian Academy of Sciences
Central Asian culture
Hungarian ethnographers
1969 births
Living people
Linguists of Turkic languages
Writers from Budapest
Mongolists